Azhaipithazh is a 2008 Indian Tamil language romantic drama film directed by P. K. Rajmohan, who previously directed the film Kedayam. The film stars newcomers Ratheesh and Sona, with M. S. Bhaskar, Balu Anand, P. K. Rajmohan, Uma Gowri and Ezhil playing supporting roles. It was released on 11 July 2008.

Plot

Shiva, a software engineer living in Chennai, arrives at his native village to attend the wedding of his relative. At the wedding, he falls under the spell of a beautiful woman (Sona) and decides to marry her at any cost. When he asks one of the villagers about her identity, he said that she is Jayanthi, the daughter of his uncle Aarusamy. Siva then convinces his parents to ask Aarusamy for giving his daughter in marriage but he turns out that Jayanthi is not the beautiful girl he saw at the wedding. An upset Shiva comes back to Chennai and his thoughts on the beautiful girl keep haunting him all the time.

His father Munya (Balu Anand) has arranged for an alliance with the beautiful girl he saw at the wedding, but Shiva is not aware of that and calls off the engagement without even seeing her. In the meantime, the beautiful girl named Sandhya bumps into the ex-serviceman Rajasekhar (P. K. Rajmohan) during a matrimonial meet and she is completely captivated by his good nature. Thereafter, Shiva finds the house of Sandhya and reveals her his love. Sandhya who has just married Rajasekhar is shocked and tells him that it is too late. The film ends with Shiva accepting to marry his relative Jayanthi who is in love with him.

Cast

Ratheesh as Shiva
Sona as Sandhya
M. S. Bhaskar as Project manager
Balu Anand as Munya
P. K. Rajmohan
Uma Gowri
Ezhil
Viji Kanna as Sandhya's mother
Rambha as Shiva's mother
C. Jayapal
Nandhu
V. S. Nallakamu
Nellai Siva
 Bava Lakshmanan as Shiva's uncle
Kottachi as Kaattu
Sivanarayanamoorthy as Tea master
N. G. Allimuthu
Meesai Nagaraj
Vijayaraj as Vijay
Eashwar as Eashwar
Periyar as Periyar
Venkat Krishna as Venkat Krishna

Soundtrack

The film score and the soundtrack were composed by Hitesh. The soundtrack features 5 tracks written by Palani Bharathi and Na. Muthukumar.

Reception
A reviewer rated the film 1.75 out of 5 and said, "the music is below average, the camerawork is amateur, editing could have been a lot better, the screenplay is simple" and concluded, "An amateur effort at tragic romance, can be passed".

References

2008 films
2000s Tamil-language films
2008 romantic drama films
Indian romantic drama films
2008 directorial debut films